SM UB-68 was a German Type UB III submarine or U-boat in the German Imperial Navy during World War I. The U-boat was ordered on 20 May 1916. She was commissioned into the German Imperial Navy on 5 October 1917  as SM UB-68. The submarine conducted five patrols and sank five ships during the war. There was one dead and thirty-three survivors.

Summary of raiding history

Notes

References

Bibliography 

 

German Type UB III submarines
U-boats commissioned in 1917
World War I submarines of Germany
1917 ships
U-boats sunk by British warships
World War I shipwrecks in the Mediterranean Sea
Maritime incidents in 1918